Garki may refer to:

Garki, Abuja, a district in Abuja
Garki, Jigawa, a Local Government Area of Jigawa State
Garki Project, a malaria study conducted in the LGA
Garki, Ostrów Wielkopolski County, in Poland